Victory at Sea (abbreviated to VAS) is a set of World War II naval wargaming rules published by Mongoose Publishing. They were a development of Mongoose's Babylon 5: A Call to Arms SF starship combat rules written by Matthew Sprange, with assistance from David Manley, Richard Bax, Erik Nicely and Agis Neugebauer, having been initially released through a series of articles in the Mongoose house journal Signs and Portents. A supplement to the rules entitled Victory At Sea - Order of Battle, including expanded ship lists and new rules, was written during 2007. It was rushed into print, unreviewed and with a large number of errors left uncorrected - an unofficial 28 page errata was available several days after its release was announced. The rules have spawned a number of unofficial period and scale variants including ironclad actions and World War II destroyer actions. An official World War I variant entitled  Victory at Sea - Age of Dreadnoughts, written by David Manley was published in 2008.

VAS caused something of a storm when it was released in 2006. It was reviled by some elements of the naval wargaming hobby as being over simplistic and unrealistic, resulting in some poor press on various wargaming fora (e.g. NavWarGames, and in the Naval Wargames Society journal Battlefleet). However, despite this a number of discussions on various internet wargaming fora have suggested that it has proven to be popular and serves as a useful "entry level" set of rules and also as a gateway into historical naval wargaming for science fiction and fantasy wargamers who are already familiar with rules published by Mongoose.

Notes

External links
 Victory at Sea at Mongoose Publishing
 
 

Mongoose Publishing games
Naval games
Miniature wargames
Wargames introduced in the 2000s